Caja de Burgos was a medium-sized savings bank, and currently a banking foundation, based in the Province of Burgos in northern Spain with headquarters in Burgos city. As a savings bank, it was also known by Caja de Ahorros Municipal de Burgos.

In 2010, as a result of the European debt crisis, it was merged with Caja Canarias, Cajasol and Caja Navarra, and incorporated as a bank by means of a new notarial instrument, forming Banca Civica. In 2012, it was subsequently absorbed by CaixaBank.

Starting in 2013, the charity part of the savings bank was established as a non-profit foundation, dedicated to support the cultural heritage and social activities eventually maintained by the bank. Its charity activities included giving the award "Excellent Youth" (Jóvenes Excelentes) starting from 2006.

See also 

 Banca Civica
 CaixaBank

References 

Bank buildings in Spain
Establishments in Spain
Defunct banks of Spain
CaixaBank